Bakpia pathok is a small, round-shaped Chinese-influenced Indonesian sweet roll (bakpia), usually stuffed with mung beans, but have recently come in other fillings as well, e.g. chocolate, durian and cheese. This sweet roll is found in Javanese and Chinese Indonesian cuisine. They are one of Yogyakarta's specialties and named after the Pathok suburb where the pastries originated.

Bakpia pathok is similar to the larger Indonesian pia, with the only difference being the size. They are commercially packaged in small boxes and sold at many food shops in Yogyakarta; bakpia were influenced by Chinese sweet rolls.

History 
It is thought that bakpia pathok was brought to Yogyakarta by a merchant from China named Kwik Sun Kwok in the 1940s. The dish initially had meat fillings and uses pork. Later on, a version with mung bean fillings was developed and this version remains popular to this day. The Pathuk subdistrict in Yogyakarta started producing their version of bakpia in the 1980s, which became the regional standard. To differentiate their products, bakpia pathok makers named their products after their house number (e.g., Bakpia Pathok 25, Bakpia Pathok 75), a practice that remains to this day. However, newer bakpia pathok makers may use different naming standards.

Ingredients 
The dough for bakpia pathok is made out of flour, salt, and coconut oil. Traditionally, bakpia pathok's filling is a combination of mungbean and sugar. However, modern variants of bakpia pathok often offer fillings with flavors such as chocolate and taro.

See also

 Bakpia

References

Kue
Indonesian pastries
Stuffed dishes